Lokvičići is a municipality in Split-Dalmatia County, Croatia, near Imotski. Lokvičići got their name after the tribe of Lokvičići, consisting of several villages and several hamlets including Berinovac, Kljenovac, Poboj, Lokvičići, Vidulini, Dolića Draga Gornja and Dolića Draga Donja. Situated between Biokovo and Zavelim with its hills and pastures, Lokvičići has attracted settlers for a very long time, as evidenced by numerous historical remains: tombstones from the 12th century and Roman roads. Nearby are lakes Mamic Lake (Lake Lokvičićko) Knezovic Lake, and Galipovac.

Municipal settlements

The settlements are part of the community: Dolića Draga, Lokvičići, Berinovac and Poboj.

Geography

Lokvičići is located at an altitude of 600–700 m, and is influenced by the sub-Mediterranean and mountain climate, as evidenced by the nearby town of Imotski, which is host to a much warmer climate.

Populated places in Split-Dalmatia County
Municipalities of Croatia